The family Nothybidae contains only the genus Nothybus, a group of colorful and elongated flies. The family has been recently revised.

Taxonomy and description
The morphology of Nothybidae is distinctive. The prothorax is elongated, with the front legs arising far back on the thorax, posterior to the anterior thoracic spiracles, making their heads appear to rest on a long neck. They are also distinguished by their narrow wing bases, patterned wings, rayed aristae, and the swollen subscutellum. Twelve nothybid species are described.  First placed in Micropezidae, Frey recognized Nothybus as deserving a suprageneric rank, and Aczel also recognized the family Nothybidae. While this group is placed in the Diopsoidea, its evolutionary relationships have never been robustly tested in a modern phylogenetic framework with molecular or morphological data. It is one of the few fly families for which no DNA data are available on NCBI GenBank.

Biology
The biology of the Nothybidae is poorly known, and the larval habitat is unknown. Some species may be larviparous, as mature larvae have been found in preserved adult female specimens. Adults have been observed displaying complex hovering and courtship behavior.

Distribution
Species of the genus Nothybus are only found in Southeast Asia.

Species
Nothybus absens Lonsdale & Marshall, 2016  – southern China
Nothybus acrobates Frey, 1958  – Myanmar and Laos
Nothybus biguttatus v.d. Wulp, 1896  – Java, Nepal, and Vietnam
Nothybus cataractus Lonsdale & Marshall, 2016  – Thailand and Laos
Nothybus kempi (Brunetti, 1913)  –  India, Myanmar, Laos, Thailand, and Vietnam
Nothybus kuznetsovorum Galinskaya & Shatalkin, 2015  – Laos and Vietnam
Nothybus lineifer Enderlein, 1922  – Java, Malaysia, Sumatra, and Thailand
Nothybus longicollis (Walker, 1856) - Borneo, Malaysia, Papua New Guinea
Nothybus magnus Galinskaya & Shatalkin, 2017  – Thailand
Nothybus procerus Lonsdale & Marshall, 2016 - southern India
Nothybus sumatranus Enderlein, 1922  – Malaysia, Sumatra, Thailand, and Vietnam
Nothybus triguttatus Bezzi, 1916  – Philippines
There are reports of additional undescribed species from Papua New Guinea and the Solomon Islands.

References

External links
Australasian/Oceanian Diptera Catalog Nothybidae
Nothybus sp. from Thailand on Diptera.info
Nothybus sp. courtship behavior on flickr
Nothybus sp. adult feeding behavior on flickr

Brachycera families
Monogeneric Diptera families
Diopsoidea